A fire umbrella is a fire dancing tool. It is made from an umbrella with the rainproof cover removed. Kevlar wicks are attached to the ends of the umbrella, soaked in a fuel, and then lit on fire. The dancer can manipulate the fire umbrella around her or his body, usually twirling it to give the illusion of a spinning ring of fire.

Notes
Fire Umbrella Examples

Fire arts
Dance props